Intelligiant is a water cannon invented by John Miscovich (1918 - August 22, 2014) in the post-WW2 years. His  Intelligiant influenced the development of fire-fighting and hydraulic gold mining, with numerous other applications. Today it is  known as a standard fire fighting cannon.

References 
 The Intelligiant: John Miskovich's rise from Alaskan gold miner to world renowned inventor mining-technology.com, accessed 2/21/2017
 

Water technology